Charles Unwin (b.1829 d.1918-01-05) was a prominent surveyor for the Government of Ontario and the City of Toronto government.
Unwin was born in the United Kingdom, and emigrated to Toronto in 1843, and lived with his uncle—also named Charles Unwin.
Unwin attended the prestigious Upper Canada College, a private high school attended by many of the leading elements of Ontario's administration.
After graduation, he apprenticed with John Stoughton Dennis, completing his apprenticeship in 1852.
He spent the next nine years surveying Muskoka County.

Unwin entered into a partnership with Vernon Bayley Wadsworth in 1868.

In 1910 the association of Ontario Land Surveyors published Unwin's 12 page autobiographical sketch.

Unwin never married.  He worked as a surveyor for Toronto from 1874 to his death, at 88 in 1918.

Unwin Avenue, the southernmost street in Toronto's Portlands, is named after Unwin.

References

1829 births
1918 deaths
English emigrants to Canada
People from Mansfield
People from Old Toronto
Canadian surveyors
Upper Canada College alumni